The 2008 TC2000 in San Luis was the 13th race of the 2008 TC2000 season. It took place at the Potrero de los Funes Circuit in Argentina on 23 November 2008.

Results

TC 2000 Championship